Tor Saunders (born April 30, 1998) is an American soccer player who plays as a goalkeeper for North Carolina FC in USL League One.

Career

Youth
Saunders attended Glacier Peak High School in Snohomish, Washington, also playing with the Seattle Sounders FC academy from 2013 to 2016. Prior to playing with the Sounders academy, Saunders was with Crossfire Premier.

College & amateur
In 2016, Saunders attended Akron University to play college soccer. In three seasons with the Zips, Saunders made 18 appearances. He also earned Academic All-MAC accolades in 2018 and 2019. In 2020, Saunders transferred to Coastal Carolina University, where he went on to make 15 appearances across the 2020–21 season. Saunders season with Coastal Carolina saw him earn All-Sun Belt honors along with the Sun Belt Newcomer of the Year award, Senior CLASS Award First-Team All-American, Sun Belt Conference Championship Most Outstanding Player, and was named to the 2021 MAC Hermann Trophy watchlist.

While at college, Saunders also played in the USL League Two with Seattle Sounders FC U-23 in 2017, and South Georgia Tormenta 2 in 2019.

Professional

Nashville SC
On January 21, 2021, Saunders was selected 74th overall in the 2021 MLS SuperDraft by Nashville SC. He officially signed with the Major League Soccer team on June 17, 2021. Saunders was released by Nashville following the 2021 MLS season.

Indy Eleven
On March 4, 2022, Saunders signed with USL Championship club Indy Eleven. The same day he was loaned to USL League One's Chattanooga Red Wolves for the 2022 season. He made his professional debut on April 2, 2022, starting in a 1–1 draw with Forward Madison. He was released by Indy Eleven on November 30, 2022, following the conclusion of the 2022 season.

North Carolina FC
Saunders signed with USL League One side North Carolina FC on January 19, 2023.

References

External links 
 

1998 births
Living people
American soccer players
Association football goalkeepers
Akron Zips men's soccer players
Coastal Carolina Chanticleers men's soccer players
Chattanooga Red Wolves SC players
Indy Eleven players
Nashville SC draft picks
Nashville SC players
North Carolina FC players
People from Snohomish, Washington
Seattle Sounders FC U-23 players
Soccer players from Washington (state)
Tormenta FC 2 players
USL League One players
USL League Two players